The Mongolian Green Party is a green party in Mongolia. It was founded in 1990, the year Mongolia became a multi-party democracy, and was the first green party founded in Asia. From 1996 until 2000 the party was in a governing coalition with the Mongolian Social Democratic Party, the Democratic Party, and the Mongolian Democratic Religion Party.

The party has around 6,000 members and states its goal is working towards improving human rights and democracy in Mongolia and protecting the environment.

Olzod Boum-Yalagch has been the party's chairman since 2012.

References

External links
Mongolian Green Party: official website
Mongolian Greens page at Global Greens

1990 establishments in Mongolia
Global Greens member parties
Green political parties
Political parties established in 1990
Political parties in Mongolia